Ratnik is a 2020 Nigerian apocalyptic science fiction Dystopian-action film written, directed and produced by Dimeji Ajibola. It is the first of its genre in the Nollywood Entertainment. It stars Osas Ighodaro, Bolanle Ninalowo, Adunni Ade and Tope Tedela. The film was earlier scheduled to be released on April 4, 2020, but was postponed to December 1, 2020 due to the COVID-19 pandemic.

Plot 
When a World War III fighter return home only to find chaos and must race to save the life of her sister who abused a chemical against various progressive war machine.

Cast 

 Osas Ighodaro as Sarah Bello
 Ani Iyoho as Mekeva
 Bolanle Ninalowo as Koko
 Adunni Ade as Peppa
 Karibi Fubara as Captain West
 Benny Willis as Taurus
 Akah Nnani as Seargent
 Zikky Alloy as Atama
 Meg Otanwa as Angela

Awards 
It received the Best Art Director and Best Costume Design award at the 2020 Africa Magic Viewers Choice awards (AMVCA).

References

External links 

 

2020 films
Nigerian science fiction films
English-language Nigerian films
2020 science fiction action films
Nigerian action films
2020s English-language films